The Lake Anne Village Center Historic District encompasses the central plaza and surrounding buildings of Lake Anne Center in Reston, Virginia.

Description

Lake Anne Center was the first village center created in the planned community, and features a mix of commercial and residential buildings around a plaza and inlet of Lake Anne, a man-made reservoir.  The village center was designed by Reston's master planner and architect James Rossant of New York City for Robert E. Simon and built 1963–67.  At the time it was considered a showcase of modern community planning; architecturally, it is composed mainly of modestly scaled Brutalist structures, including residential townhouses, mixed commercial-residential buildings, and a church.

The district was listed on the National Register of Historic Places in 2017.

Events 
The Lake Anne Village Center has been the location for a number of events in the Reston area.

One of the popular events is the Lake Anne Cardboard Regatta, hosted by the Reston Museum. During this event, teams create life sized cardboard boats and compete in various races.

Another popular event is the Reston Multicultural Festival, which has been hosted at Lake Anne in the past. This event includes live musical performances from a variety of different cultural backgrounds.

On Saturdays there is a farmer's market located in the parking lot of the Village Center. This event runs from April until December each year, where residents can buy fresh produce, flowers, along with fresh food. 

Additionally, there is a craft market in the Village Center hosted by the United Christian Parish.

See also
National Register of Historic Places listings in Fairfax County, Virginia

References

Historic districts in Fairfax County, Virginia
National Register of Historic Places in Fairfax County, Virginia
Historic districts on the National Register of Historic Places in Virginia